Myshino is a rural locality (a village) in Beketovskoye Rural Settlement, Vozhegodsky District, Vologda Oblast, Russia. The population was 4 as of 2002.

Geography 
Myshino is located 66 km southwest of Vozhega (the district's administrative centre) by road. Munskaya is the nearest rural locality.

References 

Rural localities in Vozhegodsky District